Stavros Vavouris (1925 – 7 November 2008) was a Greek poet.

Biography
Stavros Vavouris was born in Athens, Greece, in 1925, suffering a cerebral palsy.  He published his first poem entitled Chimera (Χίμαιρα) in the journal Juvenile Voice (Νεανική Φωνή).  He graduated in Literature, History and Architecture at the University of Athens in 1952. In the same year he published his first collection of poetry entitled Here You Imagine Gallops and Waves (Εδώ φαντάσου καλπασμούς και κύματα).  He taught in several schools in different parts of Greece and Athens. He worked at the Ministry of Education from 1964 to 1967. He was appointed a high school director in 1980 and remained in that positions until 1984, when he had to quit due to health problems. He authored twelve books which have been translated into English, Polish and German.

Works
 Here You Imagine Gallops and Waves (Εδώ φαντάσου καλπασμούς και κύματα, 1952)
 Poems (Ποιήματα, 1977)
 Carmina Profana (1983)
 Instantaneous: We (Τα ακαριαία: εμείς (1980-1984), 1984)
 Που πάει, που με πάει αυτό το ποίημα (1985)
 Ημέρες, νύχτες που ναι τες; (1987)
 Πού πήγε, ως πού πήγε αυτό το ποίημα (1998)
 Also This? Perhaps (Κι αυτά; Ίσως'', 1999)

References

1925 births
2008 deaths
Writers from Athens
National and Kapodistrian University of Athens alumni
20th-century Greek poets
Greek male poets
20th-century Greek male writers